El Jangueo (Hanging) was a popular radio morning talk show. It was hosted by entertainers Jimmy Nieves (Puerto Rican) and Frederick Martinez, "El Pacha" (Dominican). "El Jangueo" aired from La Kalle 105.9 FM, New York's official Reggaeton station. The show is no longer on the air.

Some of their comments could be seen to include bigoted, and misogynistic remarks about various religious groups and genders - though one of their trademarks was that they made fun of everybody equally, even themselves. They were believed to be two of the highest-paid Hispanic radio personalities in the United States.

El Jangueo was a high energy show full of jokes, pranks, news, and interviews. Almost every major Latino celebrity and personality had been a guest on the show. The show was from 3:00 to 7:00 p.m. when first launched on Latino Mix 105.9, and became the number one Spanish show, dominating one of the most significant demographics (18-34 Arbitron), even against English-language stations. "El Jangueo", changed to the morning 6:00 to 10:00 am slot, after Latino Mix switched format to La Kalle 105.9.

External links
La Kalle 105.9 FM
Radio Notas
Radio Al Aire
DondeJangueo.com
Jangueo, El
Spanish-language radio in the United States